Der Ostasiatische Lloyd (OAL) was a German language newspaper published in Shanghai, China. It served as the oldest German language newspaper in China. German communities in China and Southeast Asia read the newspaper. It was considered to be the highest quality German language newspaper in China. Most of the content focused on economics and politics, while it also had some cultural pages.

History
In 1889 it was founded as a daily newspaper in Shanghai. Herr von Gundlach originally edited the paper. Bruno Navarra succeeded Gundlach as the editor. The following editor, Carl Fink (1861-1943), served from 1900 to 1917. Fink changed the newspaper into a weekly. Hartmut Walravens, author of "German Influence on the Press in China," said "there is no doubt among specialists that the Ostasiatischer Lloyd, especially under his editorship, has been not only the first but also the best German newspaper in China." In 1916 A.P. Winston, the author of "Chinese Finance Under the Republic," described the newspaper, which was managed by trained scholars, as the "chief organ of the German interests in the Far East" and that the newspaper "deserves to rank with the better class of European or American journals devoted to commerce and finance."

As World War I broke out, difficulty increased in circulating the Der Ostasiatische Lloyd to other countries, and the demand in China for news from Germany had increased. The editors of the Der Ostasiatische Lloyd started the Deutsche Zeitung für China to cope with the demand. Walravens said that the new paper was "successful".

There was an unrelated publication that was originally named the Deutsche Shanghai Zeitung and later renamed Der Ostasiatische Lloyd. That publication was associated with the Nazi Party. It was renamed and reorganized in January 1936 so it could benefit from the reputation of the previous Der Ostasiatische Lloyd.

See also

 Shen Bao
 Shanghai Jewish Chronicle
 North China Daily News
 Shanghai Evening Post and Mercury
 Tsingtauer Neueste Nachrichten

References
 French, Paul. Through the Looking Glass: China's Foreign Journalists from Opium Wars to Mao. Hong Kong University Press, August 15, 2009. , 9789622099821.
 Walravens, Hartmut. "German Influence on the Press in China." - In: Newspapers in International Librarianship: Papers Presented by the Newspaper Section at IFLA General Conferences. Walter de Gruyter, January 1, 2003. , 9783110962796.
Also available at (Archive) the website of the Queens Library - This version does not include the footnotes visible in the Walter de Gruyter version
Also available in Walravens, Hartmut and Edmund King. Newspapers in international librarianship: papers presented by the newspapers section at IFLA General Conferences. K.G. Saur, 2003. , 9783598218378.
 Winston, A.P. "Chinese Finance Under the Republic." In: Dunbar, Charles Franklin, Frank William Taussig, Abbott Payson Usher, Alvin Harvey Hansen, William Leonard Crum, Edward Chamberlin, and Arthur Eli Monroe. The Quarterly Journal of Economics Volume 30 (167-170 of American periodical series, 1850-1900). George H. Ellis, published 1916. p. 738-779.

Notes

Further reading
 Kreissler, François. L'Action culturelle allemande en Chine: de la fin du XIXe siècle à la Seconde guerre mondiale. Les Editions de la MSH (FR), 1989. , 9782735102778. - "Deutsche Shanghai Zeitung" mentioned in pages 98, 102, 103, and 105
 Niu, Haikun (牛海坤 Niú Hǎikūn). "《德文新報》研究（1886~1917）." ("A Study/Research of Der Ostasiatische Lloyd (1886-1917)") Shanghai Jiao Tong University Press. January 1, 2012. ISBN：9787313079237.

German-language newspapers published in China
Defunct newspapers published in China
Newspapers published in Shanghai
Publications established in 1889
1889 establishments in China